In taxonomy, Pannonibacter is a genus of the Hyphomicrobiales.

References

Further reading

Scientific journals

Scientific books

Scientific databases

External links

Hyphomicrobiales
Bacteria genera